Grinshill is a civil parish in Shropshire, England.  It contains 20 listed buildings that are recorded in the National Heritage List for England.  Of these, one is at Grade II*, the middle of the three grades, and the others are at Grade II, the lowest grade.  The parish contains the village of Grinshill and the surrounding countryside.  To the north of the village is a former quarry that produced sandstone described as "the finest building stone in Shropshire".  This is used in the construction of many of the buildings in the village and elsewhere in the county.  Most of the listed buildings are houses and associated structures, farmhouses and farm buildings, and the other listed buildings consist of a church, and items in and around the churchyard, 


Key

Buildings

References

Citations

Sources

Lists of buildings and structures in Shropshire